Joshua Francis Rowley, M.A., JP, DCL (31 December 1920 – 21 February 1997), was a soldier and landowner, and Lord Lieutenant of Suffolk from 1978 to 1994.

Personal life
He was the son of Colonel Sir Charles Rowley, 6th Baronet. He was educated at Eton College and Trinity College, Cambridge. He served in the Grenadier Guards from 1940 to 1946.

In 1959 he married The Hon. Celia Ella Vere Monckton (1925-1997), 2nd daughter of the 8th Viscount Galway: they had one daughter, Susan Emily (who married the art expert Robert Holden ) and two grandchildren. Lady Rowley served as a magistrate and a lady in waiting to Princess Alexandra.

On 19 January 1962 he inherited the baronetcy from his father.

He died in 1997 and is buried in the churchyard of St Mary in Stoke-by-Nayland, Suffolk.

Public service
Rowley was Deputy Secretary of the National Trust from 1950 to 1955. He served as Chairman of  West Suffolk County Council from 1971 to 1974; and of Suffolk County Council from 1976 to 1978.

He was successively Deputy Lieutenant, High Sheriff, and Vice Lord-Lieutenant of Suffolk before his appointment as Lord-Lieutenant.  He was appointed a JP in 1978 and Honorary DCL by UEA in 1991.

References

1920 births
People educated at Eton College
Members of West Suffolk County Council
Members of Suffolk County Council
Lord-Lieutenants of Suffolk
Alumni of Trinity College, Cambridge
Grenadier Guards officers
Baronets in the Baronetage of Great Britain
1997 deaths